The Lujanian age is a South American land mammal age within the Pleistocene and Holocene epochs of the Neogene, from 0.8–0.011 Ma or 800–11 tya. It follows the Ensenadan.
The age is usually divided into the middle Pleistocene Bonaerian stage, which ends at about 130,000 years, and the Lujanian, which lasts from about 130,000 years into the early Holocene. The latter Lujanian stage overlaps chronologically with the North American Irvingtonian and Rancholabrean.

Fauna include ground sloths, litopterns, short-faced bears, South American horse Amerhippus and cingulates such as glyptodonts and the armadillo-like Pachyarmatherium.

References 

 
Pleistocene life
Holocene
Quaternary animals of South America